"Born Again" is a 1986 comic book story arc that appeared in the Marvel Comics series Daredevil. Written by Frank Miller, and drawn by David Mazzucchelli, the storyline first appeared in Daredevil #227–231. It was later reprinted in graphic novel format along with the previous issue #226, and a follow-up story arc from Daredevil #232–233, which resolves some loose ends from the original story arc. Because of this, this follow-up story arc has become generally considered part of "Born Again".

The story details Daredevil's descent into insanity and destitution at the Kingpin's hands, as well as a subsequent struggle to build a new life for himself. The storyline (amalgamated with "Guardian Devil") was loosely adapted as the 2018 third season of the Netflix Marvel Cinematic Universe (MCU) streaming television series Daredevil.

Plot summary
Karen Page, the former secretary of the Nelson & Murdock law offices in New York City and ex-girlfriend of Matt Murdock, had left years earlier to pursue an acting career. After a brief period of success, she became a heroin addict and was reduced to starring in pornographic films in Mexico. Strapped for cash, she sells the information that Matt is Daredevil for a shot of heroin. This information is sold upward to the Kingpin. Over the next six months, the Kingpin uses his influence to have the IRS freeze Murdock's accounts, the bank foreclose on his apartment, and police lieutenant Nicholas Manolis testifies that he saw Murdock pay a witness to perjure himself. By coincidence, Murdock's girlfriend Glorianna O'Breen breaks up with him and turns to dating his law partner and best friend Foggy Nelson on the rebound.

Daredevil's initial investigations uncover that Manolis is helping to frame Murdock in exchange for medical treatments for his son. Still, he is unable to find who is behind the frame-up and is unwilling to turn Manolis in to the authorities. An exceptional legal defense by Nelson saves Murdock from a prison sentence, though he is barred from practicing law. With his initial plan foiled, the Kingpin has Murdock's apartment firebombed. He also gives out the order to kill anyone else who handled the information on Daredevil's identity. Karen eludes the Kingpin's assassins and makes her way to New York to find Murdock.

Now homeless, suffering from paranoia and growing increasingly aggressive, Murdock is continuously followed by the Kingpin's subordinates, providing the Kingpin with frequent updates on Murdock's mental state, as he has become obsessed with the fruits of his scheme to destroy Murdock. Driven by thoughts of revenge, Murdock confronts the Kingpin in his office and is brutally beaten by the crime lord. To avert investigation into his death, the unconscious Murdock is drenched in whiskey and strapped into a stolen taxi cab, which is then pushed into the East River. Murdock regains consciousness, breaks out of the cab, and swims to safety. Badly injured, he stumbles through Hell's Kitchen, eventually finding his way to the gym where his father trained as a boxer. There he is found by his mother Maggie who, having not been in Matt's life for decades, has become a nun at a local Catholic church. She nurses him back to health.

Meanwhile, Daily Bugle reporter Ben Urich is investigating his confidant's plight and stands vigil with Manolis as his son is taken in for surgery. When his son dies, Manolis confesses to Urich about the frame-up and his suspicions that the Kingpin was behind it. Nurse Lois, an enforcer assigned by the Kingpin to monitor Manolis, responds by breaking Urich's fingers and beating Manolis nearly to death. The unintimidated Manolis calls Urich from his hospital bed; however, Lois breaks into his room and strangles him, laying the receiver on his bed so Urich can hear his murder. Rather than cowing him, this goads Urich to come forward with his investigation, alerting his paper and the authorities of the situation.

Karen arrives in New York, having hitched a ride with pornography fanatic Paulo Scorcese who supplies her with heroin in exchange for sexual favors. She contacts Foggy to ask about Murdock's whereabouts. When he realizes that Paulo has been beating her, Foggy insists on taking her into his home.

Increasingly obsessed with killing Murdock, Kingpin uses his military connections to procure America's super soldier Nuke. To draw Murdock out of hiding, he arranges for a violent mental patient to be released from an asylum, dress up as Daredevil, and kill Nelson. Nurse Lois is ordered to relocate so that she cannot be implicated, but she rebels and attempts to kill Urich. Murdock, who has been shadowing Urich since hearing of the articles he is writing on the Kingpin, knocks out Lois and leaves her for the authorities. He then overhears a phone call that tips him off to the plot to kill Nelson. Meanwhile, Page spots Scorcese stalking Nelson's apartment building. While she tries to prevent him from killing Nelson, the two are attacked by assassins who the Kingpin has ordered to kill anyone who emerges from the building. Murdock beats up the impostor Daredevil and saves Page, who confesses to being the one who gave away his secret identity. Murdock forgives her. Now back together, they move into a derelict apartment, where Murdock helps her through heroin withdrawal while supporting them as a diner chef.

Nurse Lois offers to testify against the Kingpin in exchange for a reduced sentence, but he has her killed by a Daily Bugle reporter sent to interview her. Having failed to draw Murdock out of hiding, the Kingpin orders Nuke to fly to Hell's Kitchen and make a general assault. From a helicopter, Nuke shoots dozens of civilians and destroys the diner where Murdock works. Appearing as Daredevil for the first time since his apartment was destroyed, he is left with no choice but to kill both Nuke and his pilot to avoid further civilian deaths. However, Nuke survives his attack, and the Avengers take him into custody.

Captain America, disturbed that Nuke has a U.S. flag tattooed on his face, investigates his background. When the military authorities give him evasive answers, he breaks into top-secret records and discovers Nuke is the only surviving test subject of several attempts to recreate Project: Rebirth, the project that enhanced the Captain's own body. Nuke breaks free from custody in the same base. Captain America stops him, but the Kingpin gives the order to kill Nuke. The military shoots Nuke. Having heard word of Nuke's escape while stealing money from Kingpin's drug importers to rebuild the diner, Daredevil grabs Nuke from Captain America and takes him to the Daily Bugle, hoping to get him to testify about the Kingpin. He is not fast enough, and Nuke dies before he can provide any evidence.

Trying to get Nuke back from Daredevil, Captain America stumbles upon one of the hitmen sent to kill Nuke. The hitman names the Kingpin as being behind Nuke's assault on Hell's Kitchen, setting off a wave of lawsuits. Although the Kingpin is able to fight off most of the charges, his public image as an honest and respectable businessman is shattered, and his lieutenants lose confidence in him. His obsession unabated, he disregards Captain America's role and plans for revenge on Murdock instead. As for Murdock, he lives happily in Hell's Kitchen with Karen and continues to fight for justice in his neighborhood.

Background and creation
With regular writer Dennis O'Neil preparing to leave the series, long-running Daredevil editor Ralph Macchio called up Frank Miller and asked if he would be interested in returning to the series. Miller, whose first stint as writer had brought Daredevil from the brink of cancellation to the top-sellers lists, agreed under the condition that artist David Mazzucchelli would work from full scripts. Contrary to rumor, Mazzucchelli did not draw over layouts by Miller; the artwork on the story is entirely Mazzucchelli's.

Themes and symbolism
"Born Again" makes heavy use of Christian symbolism, primarily from Roman Catholicism, and the title invokes the Catholic teaching on Baptism. The phrase itself is spoken by Jesus in the 3rd chapter of the Gospel of John to indicate that one's old life must come to an end for new life to begin. While the story is set during the Christmas season, it follows Easter themes almost exclusively.

The splash pages of the first four chapters all show Matt Murdock lying down. In chapters 2 and 3 he is in a fetal position, followed by him assuming the pose of the crucified Jesus Christ in chapter 4. The splash page of chapter 5 shows him standing, representative of the risen Jesus. In chapter 3, his wandering through Hell's Kitchen parallels Jesus's walk to Golgotha, including the three falls represented in the Stations of the Cross, before culminating in the image of the Pietà. Sister Maggie takes the role of the Virgin Mary and the dove (traditionally used in Christian artwork to represent the Holy Spirit) is posed above her. All the chapter titles, excluding those of the story arc in #232–233, are names of Christian concepts.

Collected editions

The trade paperback was published in 1987.

Between 2009 and 2010, Marvel reprinted Born Again in hardcover and trade paperback as part of Marvel Premiere Classic. The hardcover variant edition was limited to only 1229 copies.

In 2012, IDW Publishing published the Artist's Edition of the story in a 200-page hardcover. Unlike the usual graphic novels, this format features printing of the original artworks in a way to mimic the experience of a comic book artist viewing comic art. The size of the artwork papers were originally at the dimension of 11 x 17 inches (including the editorial notes and bleed lines seen on the papers) and were all colored. Artist's Edition is designed to print exactly the same dimension and in black and white palette to show the details of pasteovers, zip-a-tone technique, and blue pencils. Mazzucchelli personally supplied all of the artworks for scanning and supervised the process of the development for approval. The 250 copies limited edition was exclusively available only for pre-ordering; this version includes a colorful slipcase, a variant design of the front cover, and Mazzucchelli's personal signature printed in an interior page. Mazzucchelli appeared at the Midtown Comics signing event on June 28, 2012. The signing was preceded by a discussion with fellow creator Chip Kidd and a Q&A session with fans in attendance. The trade paperback known as Artisan Edition was published on 2019. This version, however, is scaled down to the standard size of a graphic novel despite retaining the same content as the regular version.

Reception
In regard to the rise of Daredevil comic popularity during Frank Miller's run in the 1980s, Born Again is considered one of, if not the best storyline within the Daredevil mythos, with praise for Miller's and Mazzucchelli's artwork, storyline and religious narrative mirroring Matt Murdock's arc from fall and rise. Fans and critics see Born Again to be an influential period during the start of the Modern Age of Comic Books.

Sequel
The "Last Rites" story arc in Daredevil #297–300, though written and drawn by an entirely different set of creators (except for colorist Christie Scheele), is to an extent a thematic sequel to "Born Again". The plot of "Last Rites" is centered on Daredevil systematically destroying the Kingpin's reputation and worldly possessions, much as the Kingpin did to him in "Born Again". In an explicit acknowledgement of this parallel, a deranged Kingpin mutters "born again..." in the final installment. The story also sees Murdock finally unraveling the frame job from "Born Again", winning back his attorney's license.

In an ongoing subplot of "Born Again", the Kingpin hires Foggy Nelson for one of his firms. When writer Frank Miller left the series, this plot thread was temporarily abandoned, before finally being resolved in Daredevil #248–256.

In other media
 Director Mark Steven Johnson had expressed interest in directing a sequel to the 2003 Daredevil film with the "Born Again" storyline as inspiration. In June 2011, Fringe writer Brad Caleb Kane was rumored to be adapting the "Born Again" storyline for the film. In August 2012, 20th century Fox turned down a pitch by director Joe Carnahan for a film based on "Born Again". On October 10, the Daredevil film rights reverted to Marvel Studios.
 Elements of the "Born Again" story arc are adapted in seasons two and three of the Netflix / Marvel Cinematic Universe (MCU) television series Daredevil. After engineering Frank Castle's prison escape, the imprisoned Wilson Fisk asks for files on Matt Murdock. Additionally, Dex Poindexter (Wilson Bethel) replaces the unnamed asylum patient in impersonating Daredevil on Fisk's behalf. Additionally, several lines from "Born Again" are used throughout Daredevil and the miniseries The Defenders.
 A new Daredevil series, subtitled Born Again, is currently in development by Marvel Studios, as part of Phase 5 of the Marvel Cinematic Universe (MCU).

References

Comics by Frank Miller (comics)
Comics set in New York City
Daredevil (Marvel Comics) storylines